In early December 2021, ethnic clashes in Northern Cameroon occurred that left several people dead. 
Estimates range from a few dozen, from at least 19 to over 22.

These are related to clashes that occurred earlier in the year.

References

2021 in Cameroon
Massacres in Cameroon